Robert Arthur Ramsay (December 3, 1973 – August 4, 2016) was a Major League Baseball pitcher. He pitched parts of two seasons, 1999 and 2000, for the Seattle Mariners, then battled brain cancer for nearly fifteen

Early years
Born and raised in Vancouver, Washington, Ramsay graduated from its Mountain View High School in 1992. He then attended Washington State University in Pullman, where he played college baseball for the Cougars for four seasons, through 1996.

During his junior year in 1995, WSU won the Pac-10 northern division, and Ramsay was the starter in the first game of the championship series against southern division winner USC at Los Angeles.

Pro career
Following his senior season at Washington State, Ramsay was selected by the Boston Red Sox in the seventh round of the 1996 draft. The Red Sox traded him to the Mariners for Butch Huskey on July 26, 1999. After the 2000 season with Seattle, Ramsay spent 2001 at Triple-A Tacoma, then was diagnosed with brain cancer (glioblastoma multiforme) in early 2002. After surgeries, chemotherapy, and radiation treatment, he attempted a comeback in 2003 with the San Diego Padres organization, but it ended his baseball career.

After baseball
Ramsay lived in Pullman in the off-season during his pro career, and spent some of his retirement coaching and teaching in Coeur d'Alene, Idaho, his wife Samantha's hometown.

The family moved back down to the Palouse at Moscow, where Samantha, a former Penn State and WSU volleyball player (setter), became an assistant professor of nutrition at the University of Idaho in 2010. While she completed her doctorate in education at UI, Ramsay earned a master's.

Death
Ramsay died at age 42 in Moscow in 2016 after suffering a seizure, a complication related to previously diagnosed brain cancer. He had survived over 14½ years since the initial diagnosis.  His widow died in a storm after being struck by lightning on the Matterhorn in 2017.

References

External links

1973 births
2016 deaths
Major League Baseball pitchers
Seattle Mariners players
Gulf Coast Red Sox players
Sarasota Red Sox players
Trenton Thunder players
Pawtucket Red Sox players
Tacoma Rainiers players
Everett AquaSox players
Lake Elsinore Storm players
Portland Beavers players
Washington State Cougars baseball players
Baseball players from Washington (state)
Sportspeople from Vancouver, Washington
Deaths from brain cancer in the United States
Deaths from cancer in Idaho
Alaska Goldpanners of Fairbanks players